Phorbia is a genus of flies belonging to the family Anthomyiidae.

The species of this genus are found in Europe and Northern America.

Selected species
 Phorbia acklandi Hennig, 1969 
 Phorbia acrophallosa Ackland, 1993

References

Anthomyiidae